Victor Sanchez may refer to:
Víctor Sánchez (writer) (born 1961), Mexican writer
Victor Sanchez (Dominican politician) (born 1966), Dominican politician
Víctor Sánchez (footballer, born 1976), former Spanish football midfielder
Víctor Sánchez (footballer, born 1987), Spanish football defender/midfielder
Victor Sanchez Union Field, Belizean football stadium